Rome is an unincorporated community in Richland County, in the U.S. state of Ohio.

History
The community was named after Rome, New York, according to local history. A variant name was Rives. A post office called Rives was established in 1837, and remained in operation until 1906.

References

Unincorporated communities in Richland County, Ohio
Unincorporated communities in Ohio